Haibang Station is an elevated station of Line 4 of the Guangzhou Metro. It started operation on 30December 2006 and is located at the junction of Changnan Road and the Jingzhu Expressway in Shiqi Town, Panyu District.

The 2010 Asian Games Village is situated outside Haibang Station.

Station layout

Exits

References

Railway stations in China opened in 2006
Guangzhou Metro stations in Panyu District